Jessica Durlacher (born 6 September 1961) is a Dutch literary critic, columnist and novelist.

Her father is the sociologist and writer Gerhard Durlacher, who survived the Auschwitz concentration camp. She is married to novelist Leon de Winter and they have two children, Moos and Moon (Solomonica).

Jessica Durlacher writes book reviews and columns for several magazines, such as Vrij Nederland.

She made her debut as a novelist in 1997 with Het Geweten (The Conscience), following with De Dochter (The Daughter) in 2000. Both novels are about children of Holocaust survivors. Her third novel, Emoticon, was published in 2004. The story is set against the background of the Israeli–Palestinian conflict. Her novels have been translated into German, Swedish, Russian and Italian.

In the fall of 2005 she was a co-professor, together with Johan Snapper and Leon de Winter, at Berkeley of the course titled Anne Frank and After, focusing on Dutch Holocaust literature and film, and recent religious and political developments in the Netherlands.

Bibliography
 Het geweten (1998)
 De dochter (2000)
 Op scherp (2001)
 Nieuwbouw (2004)
 Emoticon (2004)
 Schrijvers! (2005)

References

External links
Official website (in Dutch)

1961 births
Dutch columnists
Dutch Jews
Dutch literary critics
Dutch women literary critics
Dutch people of German-Jewish descent
Dutch women writers
Living people
Dutch women columnists
Writers from Amsterdam